Henry 'Cap' Kohlert (8 March 1892 in St. Charles, Illinois – 18 December 1939 in St. Charles, Illinois) was an American racecar driver and Aviation pioneer. He served in the United States Army 67th Balloon Corps. in World War 1. After the war he became an Automotive Mechanic, Automotive Dealer and Race car Driver. He raced a 1924 Miller 122 converted to a supercharged 91 cubic inch per indy rules. He purchased the car from fellow racer and Indy winner Tommy Milton in 1926. He raced in the 1927 Indianapolis 500 replacing Fred Lecklider on lap 19. On lap 49 at the 120 mile mark Cliff Bergere collided with him causing him to be thrown from the car. The car flipped three times in mid-air as Bergere passed underneath. A bystander jumped on the track and pulled him into the infield where he was mistaken for dead. He was rushed to the hospital and was released a few weeks later. During this time he recovered with fellow racer Norm Batten who was burned when his car caught fire in the race. A year later Kohlert qualified for the 1928 Indianapolis 500 and finished 13th. Afterwards he sold the car and bought a 1928 Waco 9 biplane. He leased land from a local farmer and after 3 years sold the interest to the plane and the field to a group of businessmen. The field later became known as Dupage Airport in West Chicago Illinois. All the time he ran an Automotive Dealership in St. Charles Illinois which sold Nash and Ford cars. In 1937 he purchased Norm Batten's Miller Fengler/Junior 8 from Batten's widow. He installed a 122 Miller engine from Harry Hartz's Indy winner and with several modifications included bigger brakes and a better oiling system Kohlert entered the car with Chicago dirt track racer Dennis 'Duke' Nalon at the wheel. The car placed 11th in 1938 and Kohlert came back to qualify with Nalon and the car in 1939 but a broken camshaft ended the run before the car could qualify.

Indianapolis 500 results

References

1892 births
1939 deaths
People from St. Charles, Illinois
Indianapolis 500 drivers
Racing drivers from Illinois
United States Army personnel of World War I